This is a list of members of the United States House of Representatives from the state of California.

For chronological tables of members of both houses of the United States Congress from the state, see United States congressional delegations from California.

Current members
As of 3 January 2023, California is represented by the following elected officials, 40 Democrats and 12 Republicans.
 : Doug LaMalfa (R), since 2013
 : Jared Huffman (D), since 2013
 : Kevin Kiley (R), since 2023
 : Mike Thompson (D), since 1999
 : Tom McClintock (R), since 2009
 : Ami Bera (D), since 2013
 : Doris Matsui (D), since 2005
 : John Garamendi (D), since 2009
 : Josh Harder (D), since 2019
 : Mark DeSaulnier (D), since 2015
 : Nancy Pelosi (D), since 1987
 : Barbara Lee (D), since 1998
 : John Duarte (R), since 2023
 : Eric Swalwell (D), since 2013
 : Kevin Mullin (D), since 2023
 : Anna Eshoo (D), since 1993
 : Ro Khanna (D), since 2017
 : Zoe Lofgren (D), since 1995
 : Jimmy Panetta (D), since 2017
 : Kevin McCarthy (R), since 2007
 : Jim Costa (D), since 2005
 : David Valadao (R), since 2021
 : Jay Obernolte (R), since 2021
 : Salud Carbajal (D), since 2017
 : Raul Ruiz (D), since 2013
 : Julia Brownley (D), since 2013
 : Mike Garcia (R), since 2020
 : Judy Chu (D), since 2009
 : Tony Cárdenas (D), since 2013
 : Adam Schiff (D), since 2001
 : Grace Napolitano (D), since 1999
 : Brad Sherman (D), since 1997
 : Pete Aguilar (D), since 2015
 : Jimmy Gomez (D), since 2017
 : Norma Torres (D), since 2015
 : Ted Lieu (D), since 2015
 : Sydney Kamlager (D), since 2023
 : Linda Sánchez (D), since 2003
 : Mark Takano (D), since 2013
 : Young Kim (R), since 2021
 : Ken Calvert (R), since 1993
 : Robert Garcia (D), since 2023
 : Maxine Waters (D), since 1991
 : Nanette Barragan (D), since 2017
 : Michelle Steel (R), since 2021
 : Lou Correa (D), since 2017
 : Katie Porter (D), since 2019
 : Darrell Issa (R), since 2021
 : Mike Levin (D), since 2019
 : Scott Peters (D), since 2013
 : Sara Jacobs (D), since 2021
 : Juan Vargas (D), since 2013

List of members representing California

See also

 List of United States senators from California
 United States congressional delegations from California
 California's congressional districts

Notes

References

 
California
United States Representatives